The Huntly Power Station is the largest thermal power station in New Zealand and is located in the town of Huntly in the Waikato. It is operated by Genesis Energy Limited, a publicly listed company (currently 51% owned by the NZ Government). The station has five operational generating units – three 250 MW coal-and-gas-fired steam turbine units, a 50 MW gas peaking plant, and a 403 MW combined cycle gas turbine plant. The station also plays an important role in voltage support for the Northland, Auckland and Waikato regions.

Operation

Generation
Each of the four original generating units, which are capable of burning either coal or gas, installed in stages between 1973 and 1985, is capable of generating 250 MW (Megawatts) of electricity, giving a historical generating capacity of 1000 MW. Its chimneys are 150 metres high and each chimney has two flues that are 7 metres in diameter.  The plant uses a reheat steam cycle, with C A Parsons turbines and Combustion Engineering boilers.

In 2004 the power station was upgraded with the addition of a 50 MW gas turbine plant, and in 2007 the combined cycle gas turbine (CCGT) plant was commissioned. This plant increased the total generating capacity of Huntly by 403 MW (250 MW gas turbine + 153 MW steam turbine). The new turbine represented an investment of NZ$520 million and it increased the total installed capacity to 1453 MW.

In 2007, Huntly operated at a load factor of 85% and was providing a large amount of the baseload energy needs of the northern North Island. In 2007, the plant was mainly gas-fired, but a dry winter in 2008 prompted more coal thermal generation.

In December 2012, Genesis Energy placed one of the four Huntly Power Station 250 MW units into long-term storage. The second coal-fired 250 MW unit was permanently retired in June 2015 after being placed in storage (with a 90 day return to service) in 2013.

In February 2021, a third 250 MW unit was brought back online to assist with drought and gas shortages and made available until September 2021. Most of the coal it is burning is imported from Indonesia, with much of it coming to Huntly by truck from Ports of Auckland, while some comes by rail from the Port of Tauranga.

Fuel and coolant
The four 250 MW units were constructed as dual fuel, able to operate on natural gas from Taranaki or coal from the nearby Rotowaro coal mine. A 10 km conveyor belt was constructed to carry coal from the mine to the power station.

Previous to the substitution of coal, Huntly used gas from the fields to power the generation of the main units as well, but these were switched in the 1990s because of dwindling resources.

Natural gas to power units 5 and 6 comes from several gas fields in Taranaki. The gas is transmitted along the 307 km, 750 mm diameter Maui gas pipeline from Oaonui production station near Opunake, which was commissioned in 1979 to supply the station.

The station uses water from the Waikato River for cooling. However, in order to protect aquatic life, conditions are imposed by the resource consent (issued under the Resource Management Act), specifying the quantity of water that can be removed by the station along with the maximum temperature of the water when returned to the river (25 °C). These conditions mean that on very hot summer days the station cannot operate at maximum capacity, and has sometimes effectively been shut down. A new cooling tower has been built as part of expansion works at the site, which allows one 250 MW unit to run at full load even during such times.

Transmission and distribution

Huntly is connected to the rest of the national grid via a large substation switchyard and six 220 kV transmission circuits carried on three high capacity transmission lines.  These transmission lines are: 
 a double circuit line (HLY-TMN-A) to Stratford in Taranaki, via Te Kowhai and Taumarunui 
 a double circuit line (HLY-OTA-A) to Otahuhu substation in Auckland, via Drury and Takanini 
 a double circuit line (HLY-DEV A) to the Ohinewai switching station, where it connects with the Otahuhu to Whakamaru C line

The Huntly switchyard also includes a grid exit point for supply to the local distribution network in the Huntly area.

Future
The plant, as the biggest carbon dioxide greenhouse gas generators of the country, contributing over half of New Zealand's emissions of greenhouse gases from electricity generation, has repeatedly drawn the ire of environmentalists and has been the focus of associated protests. A 2006 government report outlining future climate change mitigation and energy policies was seen by the operator as a sign that the plant might have to be closed by 2015 under these plans, with around 10 years of design life still remaining. It was also noted that, apart from being difficult to replace as a source of power (due to New Zealand's annually growing generation demand, especially around Auckland), such a decision would also be uneconomical for the foreseeable future, even if coal prices were to rise.

In May 2012, resource consent was granted by the Waikato Regional Council to continue running the gas and coal units for a period of 25 years.

In April 2016, Genesis Energy announced that the Huntly Power Station would continue operation of its two remaining coal / gas burning units until December 2022. The two gas turbine generators would continue to operate into the future.

Company chief executive Marc England has stated "By 2025, Genesis will only use coal in its thermal units in abnormal market conditions, and it is our intent to remove coal completely by 2030".

Genesis plans a trial of bio-fuel over summer 2022/23.

In popular culture
In the online game ElectroCity, run by Genesis Energy, coal-fired power stations take the form of Huntly.

The Huntly Power Station features in the video for the Purple Pilgrims song "Two Worlds Apart".

The power station is featured as an external setting for the 2002 television film Atomic Twister, fictionally named as Hellman-Klein Nuclear Power Plant in Tennessee.

It appears, fully modelled, in Microsoft Flight Simulator, where it was added on February 23, 2023 as part of a free update.

See also
 Electricity sector in New Zealand
 Genesis Energy Limited
 List of power stations in New Zealand
 National Grid (New Zealand)
 Marsden B

References

Further reading

External links 
Huntly Power Station (from the Genesis Energy Limited website)

Coal-fired power stations in New Zealand
Natural gas-fired power stations in New Zealand
Buildings and structures in Waikato
Huntly, New Zealand
1980s architecture in New Zealand
Brutalist architecture in New Zealand